19 Months is a 2002 Canadian mockumentary film directed by Randall Cole, starring Benjamin Ratner and Angela Vint. It was Cole's directorial debut.

Cast
 Benjamin Ratner as Rob
 Angela Vint as Melanie
 Kari Matchett as Page
 Sergio Di Zio as Steve
 Carolyn Taylor as Lisa
 Marqus Bobesich as Glen
 Scott McLaren as The Interviewer
 Brooke D'Orsay as Sandy
 Tamara Levitt as Drunk Girl 1
 Chuck Shamata as Rob's Dad

Release
The film opened in theatres in Canada on 21 May 2004.

Reception
Ken Eisner of Variety called the film "smart" and "highly entertaining" with "funny and provocative results", and praised the performances of the cast. Wendy Banks of Now called the film a "mercilessly funny and astute satire of contemporary relationships."

Katherine Monk of the Vancouver Sun gave the film a rating of 3 stars out of 5, calling it "highly believable", and wrote that the actors "sell every line". Susan Walker of the Toronto Star called the film a "smart script driving some intense performances."

Erin Oke of Exclaim! wrote that the film "offers nothing new or interesting to the genre" and called the characters "unlikeable" and "almost impossible to care about"

References

External links
 
 

2002 films
Canadian mockumentary films
2000s mockumentary films
Films directed by Randall Cole
2000s Canadian films
English-language Canadian films